Semblant is a Brazilian melodic death metal band.

Discography

Studio albums 
Last Night of Mortality (2010)
Lunar Manifesto (2014)
Obscura (2020)
Vermilion Eclipse (2022)

Demos & EPs 
Behold the Real Semblant (2008)
Behind the Mask (2011)

Band members

Current line-up 
Sergio Mazul –  growled vocals (2006-present)
J. Augusto – keyboards (2006-present)
Mizuho Lin – clean vocals (2010-present)
Sol Perez – guitars (2011-present)
Juliano Ribeiro – guitars (2011-present)
Thor Sikora – drums (2013-present)
Johann Piper – bass (2019-present)

Previous members 
Candido Oliveira – drums (2006)
Phell Voltollini – drums (2009–2011)
Roberto Hendrigo – guitars (2008–2011)
Everson Choma – guitars (2008–2011)
Mario J. B. Gugisch – bass (2006–2007)
Marcio Lucca – drums (2006)
Alison "Djesus" de Gaivos – drums (2006–2008)
Vinicius Marcel – guitars (2006)
Rafael Bacciotti – guitars (2006–2007)
Katia Shakath – vocals (2006–2010)
Leonardo Rivabem – bass (2007–2012)
Rhandu Lopez – drums (2011–2012)
Rodrigo Garcia – bass (2012–2014)
João Vitor – bass (2014–2018)

External links 

Brazilian melodic death metal musical groups
Brazilian heavy metal musical groups